Şehzade Ömer Hilmi Efendi (2 March 1886 – 6 April 1935) was an Ottoman prince, the third son of Sultan Mehmed V, and his consort Mihrengiz Kadın. His great-granddaughter, Ayşe Gülnev Osmanoğlu, is currently an author of historical novels on the history of the Ottoman dynasty.

Early years
Şehzade Ömer Hilmi was born in the apartment of the crown prince, Dolmabahçe Palace, Istanbul, on 2 March 1886. His father was Mehmed V, son of Abdulmejid I and Gülcemal Kadın, and his mother was Mihrengiz Kadın. 

Between 1911 and 1912, Ömer Hilmi attended the Imperial War College with his eldest brother Şehzade Mehmed Ziyaeddin. In 1916, during the First World War he served as the honorary colonel of the infantry in the imperial army.

On 2 September 1909, Ömer Hilmi travelled to Bursa with his father, Sultan Reşad, and brothers, Şehzade Ziyaeddin and Şehzade Mahmud Necmeddin. On 13 June 1910, he and his brothers received Şehzade Yusuf Izzeddin at the Sirkeci railway station, when he came from his first visit to Europe. Between 5 and 26 June 1911, he travelled to Rumelia with his father and brothers.

On 15 October 1917, he met with the German emperor Wilhelm II, when the latter visited Istanbul in 1917. On 9 May 1918, he also met with the Emperor Charles I of Austria, when the latter visited Istanbul in 1918, with his wife Empress Zita of Bourbon-Parma.

He was known to openly support the nationalists, and was against his father's policies.

Personal life

Ömer hilmi's first wife was Faika Hanım. She was the daughter of Mehmed Bey and wife Ayşe Hanım. She belonged to an influential noble clan, the Hunç, who were founding members of the village, and for this reason, the village was also known as Hunca Hable. She had two elder sisters, Naciye Hanım, and Hayriye Melek Hanım, who is considered Turkey's first female author of Circassian origin. She was of medium height, slim woman with blonde hair, blue eyes, and a cute face. She was the most beautiful among her sisters. The two married on 10 November 1907. Faika could not get along with Ömer Hilmi, and he divorced her two times but united again. However, then hülle (interim marriage necessary before a divorced can remarry) was required since he divorced her three times. She did not accept hülle because there were not any men in palace, and so she was dismissed from the palace of Prince Reşad. After her divorce on 20 December 1907, she got her pay check regularly, but later she could not out of fear of being informed on. She and her sisters were banished to Bursa by Sultan Abdul Hamid II, where they lived until the proclamation of the Second Constitutional Era in 1908. They left Bursa right after the declaration of the constitution.

His second wife was Nesimter Hanım. The two divorced in January 1915. His third wife was Hatice Firdevs Gülnev Hanım. She was born on 21 February 1890. Her father was a Turkish officer from Ayvalık, and her mother was Ayşe Hanım. They married on 3 October 1910. She gave birth to two children, Emine Mukbile Sultan, born in 1911, followed by Şehzade Mahmud Namık, born in 1913. She died on 31 December 1919, aged twenty nine. His fourth wife was Başter Hanım married on 16 June 1914 and his fifth wife was Mediha Hanım married on 12 July 1921.

Ömer Hilmi had been allocated apartments in the Dolmabahçe Palace. In 1910, he came into possession of the villa in Bağlarbaşı built by the Egyptian Khedive Isma'il Pasha in the hills above Üsküdar, Istanbul on the Asian side of the Bosphorus. He also owned another villa in Nişantaşı.

He was described as attractive and vigorous man, and the one who shied away from conversation.

Exile and death
At the exile of the imperial family in March 1924, Ömer Hilmi, his mother, and his two children, settled firstly in Beirut, Lebanon, then in Nice, France, and finally settling in Alexandria, Egypt. He died at Alexandria on 6 April 1935, aged forty nine, and was buried there. His remains were later interred in the mausoleum of Khedive Tewfik Pasha in Cairo, Egypt. His mother outlived him by three years, dying in 1938.

Honours
 Order of the House of Osman
 Order of Osmanieh, 1st Class; Jeweled
 Order of the Medjidie, Jeweled
 Hicaz Demiryolu Medal in gold
 Liakat War Medal in Gold 
 Imtiyaz War Medal in Silver

Military appointments
Honorary military ranks and army appointments
 1916: Colonel of the Infantry, Ottoman Army 
 Aide-de-Camp to the Sultan

Issue

Ancestry

References

Sources

External links
 
 
 Family Tree, descendants of Sultan Mahmud II. Retrieved 2011-02-28.
 Heirs of Europe, Turkey. Retrieved 2019-06-09.

1886 births
1935 deaths
Royalty from Istanbul
Ottoman Army officers
Ottoman princes
Dolmabahçe Palace